Orlando D. Franklin (born December 16, 1987) is a Jamaican-born former American football offensive lineman who played in the National Football League (NFL). He played college football at the University of Miami, and was drafted by the Denver Broncos in the second round of the 2011 NFL Draft. He also played for the San Diego Chargers, New Orleans Saints, and Washington Redskins.

High school career
Born in Kingston, Jamaica, Franklin was raised in Toronto from the age of three. Franklin and his mother later moved to Florida where he played football in high school, attending Atlantic Community High School in Delray Beach, Florida. At Atlantic Community High School, he was a teammate of Courtney Robinson, Jayron Hosley, and Preston Parker.

College career
Franklin attended the University of Miami from 2007 to 2010. He started 39 of 51 games at both offensive tackle and guard.

Professional career

Denver Broncos
Franklin was selected with the 14th pick in the 2nd round, 46th overall, by the Denver Broncos in the 2011 NFL Draft (previously traded by the Miami Dolphins in exchange for Brandon Marshall).

As a rookie, Franklin started all 16 games for the Broncos. In 2012, Franklin was a starter for all 16 games of the regular season at right tackle. Franklin started 15 games in 2013. He helped the Broncos reach Super Bowl XLVIII, only to lose against the Seattle Seahawks 43–8. He again started all 16 games in 2014.

San Diego Chargers
On March 10, 2015, Franklin agreed to a five-year contract with the San Diego Chargers.

On May 15, 2017, Franklin was released by the Chargers, after just two years into the five-year deal.

New Orleans Saints
On July 27, 2017, Franklin signed with the New Orleans Saints, only to be released just five days later.

Washington Redskins
On October 28, 2017, Franklin was signed by the Washington Redskins. On November 4, 2017, Franklin was released by the Redskins. On January 19, 2018, he signed a reserve/future contract with the Redskins. He was released on May 3, 2018. Two days later, he announced his retirement, citing his health and the inability to see his family, who live in Denver, as the primary reasons.

Post Retirement
Franklin hosts a sports-talk radio program on 104.3 The Fan in Denver. On August 30, 2021 it was announced Franklin would move to a coaching assignment with the San Francisco 49ers and work closely with his father-in-law Bobby Turner. After his lone season as a coach, Franklin returned to 104.3 The Fan in June 2022.

References

External links
Los Angeles Chargers bio
Denver Broncos bio
Miami Hurricanes bio

1987 births
Living people
American football offensive guards
American football offensive tackles
Black Canadian players of American football
Canadian expatriate American football people in the United States
Denver Broncos players
Gridiron football people from Ontario
Jamaican emigrants to Canada
Jamaican players of American football
Miami Hurricanes football players
New Orleans Saints players
San Diego Chargers players
Sportspeople from Delray Beach, Florida
Sportspeople from Kingston, Jamaica
Sportspeople from Toronto
Washington Redskins players